The 2003–04 Florida Panthers season was their eleventh season in the National Hockey League. The Panthers failed to qualify for the playoffs for the fourth consecutive season.

Offseason
Olli Jokinen was named team captain on October 7, 2003.

Regular season
On November 9, 2003, head coach Mike Keenan was fired after leading the Panthers to a 5–8–2–0 start. General manager Rick Dudley assumed coaching duties on an interim basis through February 9, 2004, when assistant coach John Torchetti was named interim head coach.

The Panthers season finale against the Carolina Hurricanes on April 4, 2004, was the final tie in NHL history. Ties were eliminated after the 2004–05 NHL lockout when the shootout was adopted.

Final standings

Schedule and results

|- align="center" bgcolor="#CCFFCC" 
|1||W||October 9, 2003||3–1 || align="left"|  Carolina Hurricanes (2003–04) ||1–0–0–0 || 
|- align="center" 
|2||T||October 11, 2003||1–1 OT|| align="left"|  Boston Bruins (2003–04) ||1–0–1–0 || 
|- align="center" 
|3||T||October 13, 2003||2–2 OT|| align="left"| @ Carolina Hurricanes (2003–04) ||1–0–2–0 || 
|- align="center" bgcolor="#FFBBBB"
|4||L||October 15, 2003||1–2 || align="left"|  Phoenix Coyotes (2003–04) ||1–1–2–0 || 
|- align="center" bgcolor="#FFBBBB"
|5||L||October 18, 2003||1–2 || align="left"| @ New York Islanders (2003–04) ||1–2–2–0 || 
|- align="center" bgcolor="#FFBBBB"
|6||L||October 20, 2003||1–3 || align="left"| @ New York Rangers (2003–04) ||1–3–2–0 || 
|- align="center" bgcolor="#CCFFCC" 
|7||W||October 22, 2003||2–1 || align="left"| @ New Jersey Devils (2003–04) ||2–3–2–0 || 
|- align="center" bgcolor="#FFBBBB"
|8||L||October 24, 2003||3–4 || align="left"|  Minnesota Wild (2003–04) ||2–4–2–0 || 
|- align="center" bgcolor="#CCFFCC" 
|9||W||October 25, 2003||3–2 || align="left"| @ Atlanta Thrashers (2003–04) ||3–4–2–0 || 
|- align="center" bgcolor="#FFBBBB"
|10||L||October 29, 2003||1–5 || align="left"| @ Philadelphia Flyers (2003–04) ||3–5–2–0 || 
|- align="center" bgcolor="#CCFFCC" 
|11||W||October 30, 2003||3–2 || align="left"| @ Ottawa Senators (2003–04) ||4–5–2–0 || 
|-

|- align="center" bgcolor="#FFBBBB"
|12||L||November 1, 2003||2–6 || align="left"|  San Jose Sharks (2003–04) ||4–6–2–0 || 
|- align="center" bgcolor="#FFBBBB"
|13||L||November 5, 2003||2–3 || align="left"|  Los Angeles Kings (2003–04) ||4–7–2–0 || 
|- align="center" bgcolor="#CCFFCC" 
|14||W||November 7, 2003||6–3 || align="left"|  Pittsburgh Penguins (2003–04) ||5–7–2–0 || 
|- align="center" bgcolor="#FFBBBB"
|15||L||November 8, 2003||0–2 || align="left"| @ St. Louis Blues (2003–04) ||5–8–2–0 || 
|- align="center" bgcolor="#CCFFCC" 
|16||W||November 11, 2003||4–0 || align="left"|  Tampa Bay Lightning (2003–04) ||6–8–2–0 || 
|- align="center" bgcolor="#FFBBBB"
|17||L||November 13, 2003||1–3 || align="left"| @ New Jersey Devils (2003–04) ||6–9–2–0 || 
|- align="center" bgcolor="#CCFFCC" 
|18||W||November 15, 2003||3–2 || align="left"| @ Pittsburgh Penguins (2003–04) ||7–9–2–0 || 
|- align="center" bgcolor="#FFBBBB"
|19||L||November 16, 2003||2–5 || align="left"| @ Atlanta Thrashers (2003–04) ||7–10–2–0 || 
|- align="center" bgcolor="#FFBBBB"
|20||L||November 19, 2003||1–4 || align="left"|  New York Islanders (2003–04) ||7–11–2–0 || 
|- align="center" bgcolor="#FFBBBB"
|21||L||November 21, 2003||3–6 || align="left"|  Atlanta Thrashers (2003–04) ||7–12–2–0 || 
|- align="center" bgcolor="#CCFFCC" 
|22||W||November 22, 2003||3–2 OT|| align="left"| @ Washington Capitals (2003–04) ||8–12–2–0 || 
|- align="center" bgcolor="#CCFFCC" 
|23||W||November 24, 2003||2–1 || align="left"|  Buffalo Sabres (2003–04) ||9–12–2–0 || 
|- align="center" 
|24||T||November 26, 2003||3–3 OT|| align="left"|  New York Rangers (2003–04) ||9–12–3–0 || 
|- align="center" bgcolor="#FFBBBB"
|25||L||November 28, 2003||3–4 || align="left"| @ Buffalo Sabres (2003–04) ||9–13–3–0 || 
|- align="center" 
|26||T||November 29, 2003||1–1 OT|| align="left"| @ Montreal Canadiens (2003–04) ||9–13–4–0 || 
|-

|- align="center" bgcolor="#FFBBBB"
|27||L||December 3, 2003||0–4 || align="left"|  Ottawa Senators (2003–04) ||9–14–4–0 || 
|- align="center" bgcolor="#FF6F6F"
|28||OTL||December 6, 2003||3–4 OT|| align="left"|  Atlanta Thrashers (2003–04) ||9–14–4–1 || 
|- align="center" 
|29||T||December 10, 2003||1–1 OT|| align="left"|  Boston Bruins (2003–04) ||9–14–5–1 || 
|- align="center" bgcolor="#CCFFCC" 
|30||W||December 12, 2003||4–2 || align="left"|  Montreal Canadiens (2003–04) ||10–14–5–1 || 
|- align="center" 
|31||T||December 13, 2003||2–2 OT|| align="left"| @ Nashville Predators (2003–04) ||10–14–6–1 || 
|- align="center" bgcolor="#FFBBBB"
|32||L||December 15, 2003||1–4 || align="left"| @ Detroit Red Wings (2003–04) ||10–15–6–1 || 
|- align="center" 
|33||T||December 17, 2003||2–2 OT|| align="left"|  Washington Capitals (2003–04) ||10–15–7–1 || 
|- align="center" bgcolor="#CCFFCC" 
|34||W||December 19, 2003||1–0 || align="left"|  Dallas Stars (2003–04) ||11–15–7–1 || 
|- align="center" bgcolor="#FF6F6F"
|35||OTL||December 22, 2003||2–3 OT|| align="left"| @ Ottawa Senators (2003–04) ||11–15–7–2 || 
|- align="center" bgcolor="#FFBBBB"
|36||L||December 23, 2003||2–5 || align="left"| @ Toronto Maple Leafs (2003–04) ||11–16–7–2 || 
|- align="center" bgcolor="#CCFFCC" 
|37||W||December 27, 2003||3–2 || align="left"|  Mighty Ducks of Anaheim (2003–04) ||12–16–7–2 || 
|- align="center" 
|38||T||December 29, 2003||4–4 OT|| align="left"|  Toronto Maple Leafs (2003–04) ||12–16–8–2 || 
|- align="center" 
|39||T||December 31, 2003||2–2 OT|| align="left"| @ Tampa Bay Lightning (2003–04) ||12–16–9–2 || 
|-

|- align="center" bgcolor="#FFBBBB"
|40||L||January 2, 2004||1–2 || align="left"|  Philadelphia Flyers (2003–04) ||12–17–9–2 || 
|- align="center" bgcolor="#CCFFCC" 
|41||W||January 3, 2004||1–0 || align="left"|  Columbus Blue Jackets (2003–04) ||13–17–9–2 || 
|- align="center" bgcolor="#CCFFCC" 
|42||W||January 8, 2004||4–3 OT|| align="left"| @ Philadelphia Flyers (2003–04) ||14–17–9–2 || 
|- align="center" bgcolor="#FFBBBB"
|43||L||January 10, 2004||2–4 || align="left"| @ Calgary Flames (2003–04) ||14–18–9–2 || 
|- align="center" 
|44||T||January 11, 2004||2–2 OT|| align="left"| @ Vancouver Canucks (2003–04) ||14–18–10–2 || 
|- align="center" bgcolor="#FFBBBB"
|45||L||January 13, 2004||2–4 || align="left"| @ Edmonton Oilers (2003–04) ||14–19–10–2 || 
|- align="center" bgcolor="#CCFFCC" 
|46||W||January 17, 2004||2–1 || align="left"|  Tampa Bay Lightning (2003–04) ||15–19–10–2 || 
|- align="center" bgcolor="#FF6F6F"
|47||OTL||January 19, 2004||1–2 OT|| align="left"|  St. Louis Blues (2003–04) ||15–19–10–3 || 
|- align="center" bgcolor="#FFBBBB"
|48||L||January 21, 2004||5–6 || align="left"|  Colorado Avalanche (2003–04) ||15–20–10–3 || 
|- align="center" bgcolor="#CCFFCC" 
|49||W||January 23, 2004||4–1 || align="left"|  Washington Capitals (2003–04) ||16–20–10–3 || 
|- align="center" bgcolor="#CCFFCC" 
|50||W||January 24, 2004||2–1 || align="left"| @ Boston Bruins (2003–04) ||17–20–10–3 || 
|- align="center" bgcolor="#FFBBBB"
|51||L||January 26, 2004||2–5 || align="left"| @ New York Rangers (2003–04) ||17–21–10–3 || 
|- align="center" 
|52||T||January 28, 2004||3–3 OT|| align="left"|  Philadelphia Flyers (2003–04) ||17–21–11–3 || 
|- align="center" bgcolor="#FFBBBB"
|53||L||January 31, 2004||2–4 || align="left"| @ New York Islanders (2003–04) ||17–22–11–3 || 
|-

|- align="center" bgcolor="#FFBBBB"
|54||L||February 3, 2004||0–3 || align="left"| @ San Jose Sharks (2003–04) ||17–23–11–3 || 
|- align="center" bgcolor="#CCFFCC" 
|55||W||February 4, 2004||5–4 OT|| align="left"| @ Phoenix Coyotes (2003–04) ||18–23–11–3 || 
|- align="center" bgcolor="#CCFFCC" 
|56||W||February 10, 2004||2–1 || align="left"|  Montreal Canadiens (2003–04) ||19–23–11–3 || 
|- align="center" bgcolor="#CCFFCC" 
|57||W||February 12, 2004||5–1 || align="left"|  Pittsburgh Penguins (2003–04) ||20–23–11–3 || 
|- align="center" bgcolor="#FFBBBB"
|58||L||February 14, 2004||2–3 || align="left"| @ Tampa Bay Lightning (2003–04) ||20–24–11–3 || 
|- align="center" bgcolor="#FFBBBB"
|59||L||February 16, 2004||1–3 || align="left"| @ Carolina Hurricanes (2003–04) ||20–25–11–3 || 
|- align="center" 
|60||T||February 18, 2004||1–1 OT|| align="left"| @ Buffalo Sabres (2003–04) ||20–25–12–3 || 
|- align="center" bgcolor="#CCFFCC" 
|61||W||February 20, 2004||2–0 || align="left"| @ Pittsburgh Penguins (2003–04) ||21–25–12–3 || 
|- align="center" 
|62||T||February 21, 2004||2–2 OT|| align="left"| @ Washington Capitals (2003–04) ||21–25–13–3 || 
|- align="center" bgcolor="#CCFFCC" 
|63||W||February 23, 2004||2–0 || align="left"| @ Boston Bruins (2003–04) ||22–25–13–3 || 
|- align="center" bgcolor="#CCFFCC" 
|64||W||February 25, 2004||4–0 || align="left"|  Toronto Maple Leafs (2003–04) ||23–25–13–3 || 
|- align="center" bgcolor="#FFBBBB"
|65||L||February 27, 2004||1–4 || align="left"|  Washington Capitals (2003–04) ||23–26–13–3 || 
|- align="center" 
|66||T||February 29, 2004||2–2 OT|| align="left"| @ Chicago Blackhawks (2003–04) ||23–26–14–3 || 
|-

|- align="center" bgcolor="#CCFFCC" 
|67||W||March 2, 2004||1–0 || align="left"| @ Washington Capitals (2003–04) ||24–26–14–3 || 
|- align="center" bgcolor="#FFBBBB"
|68||L||March 3, 2004||2–5 || align="left"|  New Jersey Devils (2003–04) ||24–27–14–3 || 
|- align="center" bgcolor="#FFBBBB"
|69||L||March 6, 2004||3–5 || align="left"|  Tampa Bay Lightning (2003–04) ||24–28–14–3 || 
|- align="center" bgcolor="#FFBBBB"
|70||L||March 9, 2004||0–5 || align="left"| @ Toronto Maple Leafs (2003–04) ||24–29–14–3 || 
|- align="center" bgcolor="#CCFFCC" 
|71||W||March 11, 2004||3–2 OT|| align="left"| @ Montreal Canadiens (2003–04) ||25–29–14–3 || 
|- align="center" bgcolor="#CCFFCC" 
|72||W||March 13, 2004||3–2 OT|| align="left"|  New York Rangers (2003–04) ||26–29–14–3 || 
|- align="center" bgcolor="#CCFFCC" 
|73||W||March 17, 2004||6–4 || align="left"|  New York Islanders (2003–04) ||27–29–14–3 || 
|- align="center" bgcolor="#FFBBBB"
|74||L||March 19, 2004||2–3 || align="left"| @ Atlanta Thrashers (2003–04) ||27–30–14–3 || 
|- align="center" bgcolor="#FFBBBB"
|75||L||March 20, 2004||1–2 || align="left"|  Buffalo Sabres (2003–04) ||27–31–14–3 || 
|- align="center" bgcolor="#FF6F6F"
|76||OTL||March 23, 2004||3–4 OT|| align="left"|  New Jersey Devils (2003–04) ||27–31–14–4 || 
|- align="center" bgcolor="#FFBBBB"
|77||L||March 25, 2004||2–3 || align="left"| @ Carolina Hurricanes (2003–04) ||27–32–14–4 || 
|- align="center" bgcolor="#FFBBBB"
|78||L||March 27, 2004||0–3 || align="left"|  Atlanta Thrashers (2003–04) ||27–33–14–4 || 
|- align="center" bgcolor="#CCFFCC" 
|79||W||March 29, 2004||3–1 || align="left"|  Carolina Hurricanes (2003–04) ||28–33–14–4 || 
|- align="center" bgcolor="#FFBBBB"
|80||L||March 31, 2004||4–5 || align="left"|  Ottawa Senators (2003–04) ||28–34–14–4 || 
|-

|- align="center" bgcolor="#FFBBBB"
|81||L||April 1, 2004||3–4 || align="left"| @ Tampa Bay Lightning (2003–04) ||28–35–14–4 || 
|- align="center" 
|82||T||April 4, 2004||6–6 OT|| align="left"|  Carolina Hurricanes (2003–04) ||28–35–15–4 || 
|-

|-
| Legend:

Player statistics

Scoring
 Position abbreviations: C = Center; D = Defense; G = Goaltender; LW = Left Wing; RW = Right Wing
  = Joined team via a transaction (e.g., trade, waivers, signing) during the season. Stats reflect time with the Panthers only.
  = Left team via a transaction (e.g., trade, waivers, release) during the season. Stats reflect time with the Panthers only.

Goaltending

Awards and records

Awards

Milestones

Transactions
The Panthers were involved in the following transactions from June 10, 2003, the day after the deciding game of the 2003 Stanley Cup Finals, through June 7, 2004, the day of the deciding game of the 2004 Stanley Cup Finals.

Trades

Players acquired

Players lost

Signings

Draft picks
Florida's draft picks at the 2003 NHL Entry Draft held at the Gaylord Entertainment Center in Nashville, Tennessee.

Notes

References

 
 

Flo
Flo
Florida Panthers seasons
Florida Panthers
Florida Panthers